Sakai Sambayan Lampung Football Club (simply known as S.S. Lampung) is an Indonesian football club based in Bandar Lampung, Lampung. They currently compete in the Liga 3 and their homeground is Sumpah Pemuda Stadium.

Honours
 Liga 3 Lampung
 Champion : 2018
 Runner-up : 2019

References

External links

Football clubs in Indonesia
Football clubs in Lampung
Association football clubs established in 2014
2014 establishments in Indonesia